is a retired Japanese sprinter who specializes in the 400 metres.

He finished fourth in 4 × 400 m relay at the 2004 Olympic Games, together with teammates Yuki Yamaguchi, Jun Osakada and Tomohiro Ito. Sato also competed at the World Championships in 2003, 2005 and 2007.

His personal best time is 45.50 seconds, achieved in June 2003 in Yokohama.

International competition

National titles
Japanese Championships
400 m: 2003, 2004

References

External links

Mitsuhiro Sato at JAAF 
Mitsuhiro Sato at Fujitsu Track & Field Team  (archived)
Mitsuhiro Sato at TBS  (archived)
Mitsuhiro Sato at JOC 

1980 births
Living people
Sportspeople from Fukushima Prefecture
Japanese male sprinters
Olympic male sprinters
Olympic athletes of Japan
Athletes (track and field) at the 2004 Summer Olympics
Universiade medalists in athletics (track and field)
Universiade bronze medalists for Japan
Medalists at the 2001 Summer Universiade
World Athletics Championships athletes for Japan
Japan Championships in Athletics winners
People from Aizuwakamatsu
21st-century Japanese people